Yellowknife Airport  is located in Yellowknife, Northwest Territories, Canada. The airport is part of the National Airports System, and is operated by the Government of the Northwest Territories. The airport has regular scheduled passenger service and a number of freight services. In 2007, the terminal handled 527,000 passengers.

In 2008 the airport's passenger terminal underwent an expansion to the departure/check-in section, roughly doubling the size of the terminal. The airport is classified as an airport of entry by Nav Canada and is staffed by the Canada Border Services Agency (CBSA). CBSA officers at this airport can handle general aviation aircraft only, with no more than 15 passengers.

The Royal Canadian Mounted Police (RCMP) "G" Division maintains a hangar for its air section just south of the passenger terminal. It is adjacent to a hangar used by the Royal Canadian Air Force (RCAF) to house the CC-138 Twin Otter and other utility aircraft operated by 440 Transport Squadron, a subsidiary of 8 Wing.

Canadian NORAD Region Forward Operating Location Yellowknife is located south-west of the airstrip. It was built for forwarding deployment of the McDonnell Douglas CF-18 Hornet in times of conflict.

History

Yellowknife Airport was initially built by Canadian Pacific Airlines in 1944, then sold to the federal Department of Transport in 1946. A new terminal building was built in 1963 and control tower in 1972. Renovation to these facilities were completed in 1967, 1998 and 2005-2006.

Airlines and destinations

Passenger

Cargo

Emergency services

The airport has its own fire and rescue service. The department has ten firefighters, but requires only two or three firefighters on shift to operate a single crash tender. Ambulance and additional fire response are provided by the Yellowknife Fire Department.

See also
 Yellowknife Water Aerodrome

References

External links

Yellowknife Airport
Entry about Yellowknife Airport on the Canadian Owners and Pilots Association's Places to Fly Airport Directory

Certified airports in the North Slave Region
Transport in Yellowknife
National Airports System